(), a small capital Q, may refer to:

Voiceless upper-pharyngeal plosive, a consonant in pathological speech
The syllable-final component of a geminate consonant in Japanese phonology